Blueprints for the Black Market is the debut studio album by the band Anberlin. It was released on May 6, 2003, barely a year after the band formed, and was the only album that was released with guitarist Joey Bruce in the band line-up.  Blueprints had two singles, "Readyfuels", for which a music video was filmed and "Change the World (Lost Ones)".  Although the album has sold over 60,000 units, its success pales compared to Anberlin's later albums, failing to chart on the Billboard 200.

Music style
The music has been referred to as Emo sounding.

Critical reception

Blueprints for the Black Market garnered generally positive reception from Music critics. At CCM Magazine, Brian Quincy Newcomb graded the album a B−, stating how the release "rocks assuredly, benefiting from the dynamic production of Aaron Sprinkle". Johnny Loftus rated it two stars, writing how the album "lack[s] any definition" and this makes the release "an utterly pleasant bore." At Christianity Today, Russ Breimeier rated it three stars, saying that the album "sounds absolutely terrific." Tony Cummings of Cross Rhythms rated it a perfect ten squares, calling this "something special" that will be "A must for every rock buff." At Jesus Freak Hideout, Matt Gray rated it four-and-a-half stars, proclaiming this to be a "glorious debut". Bert Gangl of The Phantom Tollbooth rated it four stars, noting that the band "succeeds magnificently [...] crafting a work of sweeping, melodic, emotional, hook-laden beauty." At Melodic, Pär Winberg rated the album three stars, remarking that it is an "Impressive debut."

Track listing 
 All songs written and composed by Anberlin except where noted.

 "Readyfuels" – 3:37
 "Foreign Language" – 2:49
 "Change the World (Lost Ones)" – 3:59
 "Cold War Transmissions" – 3:12
 "Glass to the Arson" – 3:29
 "The Undeveloped Story" – 3:27
 "Autobahn" – 3:25
 "We Dreamt in Heist" – 3:17
 "Love Song" (W. Bransby, S. Gallup, R. O'Donnell, R. Smith, P. Thompson, and L. Tolhurst) – 3:05 (The Cure cover)
 "Cadence" – 3:17
 "Naïve Orleans" – 4:08

Personnel 
Anberlin
 Stephen Christian – lead vocals, keyboards
 Joseph Milligan – lead guitar, vocals
 Joey Bruce – rhythm guitar
 Deon Rexroat – bass guitar
 Nathan Young – drums, percussion

Production
 Aaron Sprinkle – production, engineering, mixing
 J. R. McNeely – mixing
 Troy Glessner – mastering
 Michael Christian McCaddon – art direction, photography, design
 David Johnson – band photography
 Brandon Ebel – executive producer

References

External links 
 

Anberlin albums
2003 debut albums
Tooth & Nail Records albums
Albums produced by Aaron Sprinkle